Group D of the 2006 Fed Cup Europe/Africa Zone Group I was one of four pools in the Europe/Africa Zone Group I of the 2006 Fed Cup. Four teams competed in a round robin competition, with the top team and the bottom team proceeding to their respective sections of the play-offs: the top team played for advancement to the World Group II Play-offs, while the bottom team faced potential relegation to Group II.

Belarus vs. Estonia

Israel vs. Sweden

Israel vs. Romania

Estonia vs. Sweden

Belarus vs. Romania

Israel vs. Estonia

Belarus vs. Sweden

Estonia vs. Romania

Belarus vs. Israel

Sweden vs. Romania

See also
Fed Cup structure

References

External links
 Fed Cup website

2006 Fed Cup Europe/Africa Zone